Muntogna da Schons is a municipality in the Viamala Region in the Swiss canton of Graubünden. On 1 January 2021 the former municipalities of Casti-Wergenstein, Donat, Lohn and Mathon merged to form the new municipality of Muntogna da Schons.

History

Casti-Wergenstein
Casti-Wergenstein was created in 1923 through the union of the formerly independent municipalities of Casti and Wergenstein.

Casti is first mentioned in 1204 as ad Castellum.  Wergenstein is first mentioned in 1219 as Vergasteno.

Donat
Donat is first mentioned in the middle 12th Century as ad Anede.

Lohn
Lohn is first mentioned in mid-12th Century as Laune and Lune. In 1219 it was mentioned as de Laone.

Mathon
Mathon is first mentioned about 840 as in Mentaune.

Geography

Demographics

Historic Population
The historical population is given in the following chart:

References

External links

 
Municipalities of Graubünden